Nishada niveola is a moth of the family Erebidae first described by George Hampson in 1900. It is found in New Guinea.

References

Lithosiina
Moths described in 1900